Duke Gong of Chen (reigned 631 BC – died 614 BC) was the eighteenth ruler of the ancient Chinese state of Chen during the Spring and Autumn period. His ancestral surname was Gui, given name Shuo (朔), and Gong (共) was his posthumous name.

Duke Gong succeeded his father Duke Mu of Chen, who died in 632 BC after 16 years of reign. He reigned for 18 years and died in 614 BC. He was succeeded by his son Pingguo, posthumously known as Duke Ling of Chen.

References

Bibliography

Monarchs of Chen (state)
7th-century BC Chinese monarchs
7th-century BC births
614 BC deaths